Lily Tuck (born October 10, 1938) is an American novelist and short story writer whose novel The News from Paraguay won the 2004 National Book Award for Fiction. 
Her novel Siam was nominated for the 2000 PEN/Faulkner Award for Fiction. She is a Guggenheim Fellow.

She has published five other novels, two collections of short stories, and a biography of Italian novelist Elsa Morante.

Life 
An American citizen born in Paris, Tuck now divides her time between New York City and Islesboro, Maine; she has also lived in Thailand and (during her childhood) Uruguay and Peru. Tuck has stated that "living in other countries has given me a different perspective as a writer. It has heightened my sense of dislocation and rootlessness. ... I think this feeling is reflected in my characters, most of them women whose lives are changed by either a physical displacement or a loss of some kind".

Works 

Novels
Sisters. New York: Atlantic Monthly Press, 2017. 
The Double Life of Liliane. New York: Atlantic Monthly Press, 2015. 
I Married You For Happiness.  New York: Atlantic Monthly Press, 2011. 
The News from Paraguay.  New York: HarperCollins, 2004. 
Siam, or the Woman Who Shot a Man.  New York: Overlook Press, 1999. 
The Woman Who Walked on Water. New York: Riverhead Books, 1996.  
Interviewing Matisse or the Woman Who Died Standing Up. New York: Knopf, 1991.  

Short Stories
Heathcliff Redux and Other Stories. New York: Atlantic Monthly Press, Feb. 4, 2020. 
The House at Belle Fontaine: Stories. New York: Atlantic Monthly Press, 2013. 
Limbo, and Other Places I Have Lived.  New York: Harper Perennial, 2002.  

Biography
 Woman of Rome: A Life of Elsa Morante. New York: HarperCollins, 2008.

References

External links

Chapter One of The News from Paraguay.
"Dream House," a short story by Lily Tuck.
Author Bio, Photo, and National Book Award Acceptance Speech.
National Public Radio All Things Considered interview with Tuck (audio file).
Charlie Rose interview with Lily Tuck and 2004 National Book Award Finalists (video file).

20th-century American novelists
21st-century American novelists
American women novelists
1939 births
Living people
National Book Award winners
American women short story writers
20th-century American women writers
21st-century American women writers
20th-century American short story writers
21st-century American short story writers
PEN/Faulkner Award for Fiction winners